Kolhufushi (Dhivehi: ކޮޅުފުށި) is one of the inhabited islands of Meemu Atoll.

History

2004 tsunami and aftermath
The island was greatly affected by the 2004 tsunami, although coral reefs took some of the impact. The island's chief, Mr. Sigee, described the water as reaching his chin. Two weeks after the disaster, the island's population was found to have lost at least sixteen people, and the island's mango and banana trees had been poisoned by the saltwater. Some homes and a century-old mosque had also been destroyed. Most of the other houses were unsuitable for habitation, leaving only a handful of functional homes.

By mid-January 2005, 8% of the 13,000-strong displaced Maldivian population was housed in temporary shelters on Kolhufushi. The construction of 55 replacement houses was started in October 2008, and a further 168 houses were started in 2010.

Tsunami drills were introduced on the island in 2018. A tsunami warning in 2016 had uncovered a lack of preparedness, for dealing with safe evacuation.

Geography

Demography

Utilities
Electrification on Kolhufushi was undertaken by MTCC in 2013. A submarine cable network was laid to the island, by Ooredoo Maldives, in 2017.

Health care
Kolhufushi has a pharmacy.

Sport
The island has a football team. The team won every one of their group games at the 2017 Haf Islanders Cup, but lost to Male' in the semi-final.

Transport
The construction of Kolhufushi's harbour was contracted in January 2016, and was completed the following year. The harbour was inaugurated in 2018.

See also
List of lighthouses in the Maldives

References

Islands of the Maldives
Lighthouses in the Maldives